The 2008 Southland Conference men's basketball tournament took place March 13–16, 2008, at Merrell Center in Katy, Texas.

Format
The top eight eligible men's basketball teams in the Southland Conference receive a berth in the conference tournament.  After the conference season, teams are seeded by conference record.

Bracket

Sources
2008 Tournament Bracket

References

Tournament
Southland Conference men's basketball tournament
Southland Conference men's basketball tournament
Southland Conference men's basketball tournament